Sulcimentisauria is a clade of derived silesaurid dinosauriforms.
Sulcimentisaurian fossils have been found in North and South America, Europe, and Africa. It was defined as "the most inclusive clade that includes Silesaurus opolensis but not Asilisaurus kongwe".

Etymology

References 

Silesaurids
Triassic archosaurs